Events in the year 1978 in the Republic of India.

Incumbents
 President of India – Neelam Sanjiva Reddy
 Prime Minister of India – Morarji Desai
 Chief Justice of India – Mirza Hameedullah Beg (until 21 February), Yeshwant Vishnu Chandrachud (starting 22 February)

Governors
 Andhra Pradesh – Sharda Mukherjee (until 15 August), K. C. Abraham (starting 15 August)
 Assam – L. P. Singh 
 Bihar – Jagannath Kaushal 
 Gujarat – Kambanthodath Kunhan Vishwanatham (until 14 August), Sharda Mukherjee (starting 14 August)
 Haryana – Harcharan Singh Brar
 Himachal Pradesh – Amin ud-din Ahmad Khan 
 Jammu and Kashmir – L. K. Jha 
 Karnataka – Govind Narain
 Kerala – Jothi Venkatachalam  
 Madhya Pradesh – N. N. Wanchu (until 16 August), C. M. Poonacha (starting 16 August)
 Maharashtra – Sri Sadiq Ali 
 Manipur – L.P. Singh 
 Meghalaya – L.P. Singh 
 Nagaland – L.P. Singh 
 Odisha – Bhagwat Dayal Sharma
 Punjab – Jaisukh Lal Hathi
 Rajasthan – Raghukul Tilak
 Sikkim – B B Lal 
 Tamil Nadu – Prabhudas Patwari
 Tripura – L. P. Singh 
 Uttar Pradesh – Ganpatrao Devji Tapase 
 West Bengal – Anthony Lancelot Dias

Events
 National income - 1,126,714 million
 1 January – Air India Flight 855, a Boeing 747 passenger jet, crashes into the Arabian Sea after takeoff near Bombay, killing all 213 on board.
 16 January – Morarji Desai led government demonetizes high denomination banknotes.
 29 March – Dr. Leo Rebello pioneers a 60 lessons distance learning course in Naturopathy to train Naturopaths to serve in India's 560,000 villages. 
 1 May – Launch of District Industrial Centre by Minister of Industries George Fernandes. 
 7 November – Indira Gandhi is re-elected to the Indian parliament.
 19 December – Indira Gandhi is arrested and jailed for a week for breach of privilege and contempt of parliament.

Law

Births

January to June
13 January – Ashmit Patel, actor.
16 January  Vijay Sethupathi, actor.
21 March – Rani Mukerji, actress.
28 March – Nafisa Joseph, model, MTV VJ, Miss India 1997 (d.2004).
16 April – Lara Dutta, actress, Miss Universe in 2000.
4 May – Samita Singh Virtigo patients of Deodh Madhubani Bihar
5 May – Sandeep Baswana, actor.
25 June – Aftab Shivdasani, actor.

July to December
17 August – Disha Vakani, actress.
21 August – Bhumika Chawla, actress.
31 August – Jayasurya, actor.
4 October – Soha Ali Khan, actress.
18 October  Jyothika, actress.
20 October – Virender Sehwag, cricketer.
1 November – Manju Warrier, actress.
25 November – Sameer Dad, field hockey player.
25 November – Rakhi Sawant, actress

Deaths
19 February – Pankaj Mullick, singer and composer (b. 1905).
18 November – Dhirendra Nath Ganguly, film entrepreneur, actor and director (b. 1893).

See also 
 Bollywood films of 1978

References

 
India
Years of the 20th century in India